Sven-Olle Olsson (26 April 1929 - 25 November 2005) was a Swedish farmer and local politician in Sjöbo Municipality, who opposed the idea of Sjöbo Municipality admitting refugees. It led to a referendum in September 1988, where the majority voted against admitting refugees. After the referendum, Sven-Olle was dismissed from the Swedish Centre Party, as Sven-Olle Olsson was accused for connections to the New Swedish Movement.

In 1991, he founded the Sjöbo Party. Between 1991 and 1998, he was municipal commissioner of Sjöbo Municipality.

References

Swedish politicians
1929 births
2005 deaths